Dance is the third compilation album by Greek singer Despina Vandi, featuring a collection of dance music including both laïka and pop during her time at the Minos EMI label. The album was included as the second disc of the box set Despina Vandi in 2005.

Track listing

Release history

Credits and personnel

Personnel
Tony Kontaxakis - music
Lambis Livieratos - lyrics
Phoebus - music, lyrics
Despina Vandi - vocals

Production
Panos Bothos - transfer

Design
Giorgos Kolovos - artwork
Takis Spiropoulos - photos

Credits adapted from the album's liner notes.

References

External links
 Official site 

2004 compilation albums
Albums produced by Phoebus (songwriter)
Despina Vandi compilation albums
Greek-language albums
Minos EMI compilation albums